Side One is the thirteenth solo album by Adrian Belew, originally released in 2005. The album features bassist Les Claypool (from Primus) and drummer Danny Carey (from Tool) on its first three tracks.

The track "Beat Box Guitar" was nominated for a Grammy in the "Best Rock Instrumental Performance" category in 2005. (It lost to "69 Freedom Special" by Les Paul & Friends.)

Track listing
All songs written by Adrian Belew, except where noted.
 "Ampersand" – 4:23
 "Writing on the Wall" – 3:53
 "Matchless Man" – 2:32
 "Madness" (Adrian Belew, Aram Khachaturian) – 6:54
 "Walk Around the World" – 4:58
 "Beat Box Guitar" – 5:08
 "Under the Radar" – 1:39
 "Elephants" – 2:15
 "Pause" – 1:20

Personnel

Musicians
 Adrian Belew – all instruments and vocals
 Les Claypool – bass (tracks 1–3)
 Danny Carey – drums (tracks 1–2), tabla (track 3)
 Gary Tussing – cello (track 4)
 Peter Hyrka – violin (tracks 4, 9)
 Ian Wallace – "voice of the BBC"

Technical
 Adrian Belew – producer, cover art
 Ken Latchney – engineer, mixing
 Andrew Mendelson – mastering
 Julie Rust – layout design

References 

Adrian Belew albums
2005 albums
Albums produced by Adrian Belew
Sanctuary Records albums